Dong-won is a Korean masculine given name. Its meaning depends on the hanja used to write each syllable of the name. There are 24 hanja with the reading "dong" and 35 hanja with the reading "won" on the South Korean government's official list of hanja which may be registered for use in given names.

People
People with this name include:

Sportspeople
Choi Dong-won (1958–2011), South Korean baseball pitcher (Korea Baseball Organization)
Han Dong-won (born 1986), South Korean football forward (K-League Challenge)
Ji Dong-won (born 1991), South Korean football striker (Bundesliga)
Lee Dong-won (footballer) (born 1983), South Korean football defender (Indonesia Super League)
Lee Dong-won (figure skater) (born 1996), South Korean figure skater
Seo Dong-won (footballer born 1973), South Korean football forward (K-League Classic)
Seo Dong-won (footballer, born 1975), South Korean football midfielder (K-League Classic)
Yang Dong-won (born 1987), South Korean football goalkeeper (K-League Classic)

Other
Gang Dong-won (born 1981), South Korean actor
Kim Dong-won (filmmaker, born 1955), South Korean documentary filmmaker
Kim Dong-won (director, born 1962), South Korean director and screenwriter
Kim Dong-won (percussionist) (born 1965), South Korean traditional percussionist
Lim Dong-won (born 1934), South Korean politician

See also
List of Korean given names

References

Korean masculine given names